Dead Calm Chaos is the second studio album by Swedish death metal band Evocation. It was released on 31 October 2008 through Cyclone Empire Records.

Track listing

Personnel

Evocation
 Janne Kenttäkumpu Bodén – drums, backing vocals
 Martin Toresson – bass
 Thomas Josefsson – vocals
 Vesa Kenttäkumpu – guitars
 Marko Palmén – guitars

Guest musicians
 Dan Swanö – additional vocals on "Antidote"
 Anders Björler – lead guitars on "Angel of Torment" and "Razored to the Bone"

Miscellaneous staff
 Robert Elmengård – photography
 Janne Aspenfelt – drum technician
 Kristian Wåhlin – logo
 Travis Smith – cover art, layout, artwork 
 Johan Örnborg – mastering
 Christian Silver – mastering
 Vesa Kenttäkumpu – recording, mixing, production, engineering
 Anton Hedberg – photography

References

2008 albums
Evocation (band) albums